Giuseppe Scurto (born 5 January 1984) is an Italian former football player and current coach who played as a defender. He is in charge of Torino Primavera.

Club career 
Scurto made his Serie A debut with A.S. Roma on 7 November 2004, in a 1–1 away draw against A.C. Milan. He joined Chievo in 2005 for €250,000 and Chievo bought the remain 50% rights for €100,000 on 20 June 2007. However, in July Scurto was sold to Treviso for about €1.7 million. In 2009, he moved to Triestina. In June 2011 he terminated his contract with Triestina, but under FIGC rule, he would effectively become a free agent in winter window.

He retired in 2012 after a short-lived stint at Juve Stabia due to persistent physical issues.

International career 
Scurto was capped for Italy at every youth level, and was called up to UEFA U-21 Championship 2006.

Coaching career 
Following his early retirement, Scurto was offered a coaching role as head of the Berretti Under-19 team at Juve Stabia, which he accepted; he then left Juve Stabia in July 2013 to accept an offer as head of the Allievi Nazionali Under-17 team at Palermo.

In July 2017 he was promoted as head of the Primavera Under-19 team, with whom he won the inaugural season of both the Campionato Primavera 2 and the Supercoppa Primavera 2. On his first season in charge of the club at the Campionato Primavera 1 level, he managed to keep Palermo in the top flight; he left the club by the end of the season after his contract expired.

On 15 July 2019, he was announced as new Primavera coach of Trapani. He left Trapani in August 2020 to move to SPAL as their new Primavera coach. After one season at SPAL, Scurto then agreed to return to Roma as their new Under-18 youth coach.

In June 2022, Scurto left Roma to sign for Torino as the new coach in charge of the Torino Primavera youth team.

Honours

Player 
Italy U19
 2003 UEFA U-19 Championship

Manager 
Palermo
 Supercoppa Primavera 2: 2018
 Campionato Primavera 2: 2018

References

External links
http://www.gazzetta.it/speciali/2008/calcio/Players/player_p188648.shtml

1984 births
Living people
Italian footballers
Italy youth international footballers
Italy under-21 international footballers
Serie A players
Serie B players
A.C. ChievoVerona players
A.S. Roma players
Treviso F.B.C. 1993 players
U.S. Triestina Calcio 1918 players
S.S. Juve Stabia players
Association football central defenders
People from Alcamo
Footballers from Sicily
Sportspeople from the Province of Trapani